Umvolkung is a term in Nazi ideology used to describe a process of assimilation of members of the German people (the Volk) as a way for them to forget about their language and their origin. As a neologism, it echoes Umpolung, 'polarity inversion', leading to an interpretation akin to "ethnicity inversion".

The term is also used to describe the "re-Germanisation" of the German people, after new Lebensraum was conquered and the German people who already resided there would become more German again. Umvolkung in the first sense was seen as a negative process during the Third Reich, while the second process was seen as more desirable.

Origin and background 
The term was invented by Albert Brackmann, a leader of the Ostforschung, a research organization that investigated the character and attitudes (Verhalten) of people living in areas east of the German Reich, such as Poland, Ukraine, Slovakia and Romania.

There was a plan to conquer almost all of Eastern Europe and process the Umvolkung so that all of the formerly German people who had slowly assimilated and mixed with other ethnicities would again become more German.

Use of the word today 
The term, or translations thereof (e.g. Dutch "omvolking"), is still currently used by right-wing groups and political parties to refer to a general fear of "replacement" of a perceived "indigenous" people by a perceived "other" population (e.g. examples from the Netherlands, Austria, and Germany).

See also 
 Lebensraum
 Generalplan Ost
 Germanisation
 Xenophobia
 Volk
 Glossary of Nazi Germany

References 

 
 

Nazi terminology
Cultural assimilation
German words and phrases